Season 2017–18 saw Greenock Morton compete in the Scottish Championship the second tier of Scottish football, having finished fourth in 2016-17. Morton also competed in the Challenge Cup, Scottish League Cup and the Scottish Cup.

Fixtures and results

Pre–Season

Scottish Championship

Scottish League Cup

Group stage
Results

Group F Table

Scottish Challenge Cup

Scottish Cup

Player statistics

All competitions

First team transfers
From end of 2016-17 season, to last match of season 2017-18

In

Out

Team Statistics

League table

References

Greenock Morton F.C. seasons
Greenock Morton